The churring cisticola (Cisticola njombe) is a species of bird in the family Cisticolidae.
It is found in Malawi, Tanzania, and Zambia.
Its natural habitat is subtropical or tropical high-altitude grassland.

References

churring cisticola
Birds of East Africa
churring cisticola
Taxonomy articles created by Polbot